Dream & Memories is an album by Favorite Blue.

Track listing
 "Overture "Let My Heart Beat Reach In 2 U"
 "SHAKE ME UP!"
 "Snowball fallin' on my head"
 "SQUALL"
 "Lovin' you"
 "愛よりも激しく、誰よりも愛しく"
 "Active, my dream"
 "Brand new season
 "素直に言えたら"
 "Dream & Memories"
 "Remember day"
 "Love Bright ~幸せの中で"
 "誰にも負けないで"
 "Epilogu"

1997 albums
Favorite Blue albums